The Republic of Vietnam Staff Service Medal was a military award of South Vietnam established in 1964. The medal was awarded in two classes and was awarded for outstanding initiative and devotion an individuals assigned staff duty.

Criteria
To be awarded the Staff Service Medal, a service member must have performed military duty, while serving on a military staff, of the Republic of Vietnam. Recipients must have shown, "...outstanding initiative and devotion to their assigned staff duty". The Staff Service Medal was presented in two classes for such service with the first class for officers and the second class for non-commissioned officers and enlisted personnel.  The two different grades were annotated by border coloring on the medal’s ribbon, the first class being green and the second class blue.

References

External links
 Military awards of Vietnam and Cambodia
 Army Board for Correction of Military Records (Case File mentioning VSSM)

Military awards and decorations of Vietnam
Military of South Vietnam
Awards established in 1964
Awards disestablished in 1973